Palaeophiidae is an extinct family of marine snake  within the infraorder Alethinophidia.

Species within this family lived from the Late Cretaceous to the Late Eocene, approximately from 70.6 to 33.9 million years ago. Phylogenetic analysis has proposed them as being related to the extant file snakes (family Acrochordidae), although these results have been disputed since and new analysis show this relationship as poorly supported.

Subfamilies and genera 
 Archaeophiinae  Rage et al. 2003
 Archaeophis  Massalongo 1859
 Palaeopheinae  Lydekker, 1888
 Palaeophis  Owen 1841
 Pterosphenus  Lucas 1898

References 

Cretaceous snakes
Prehistoric reptile families
Cretaceous first appearances
Eocene extinctions
Cretaceous–Paleogene boundary
Taxa named by Richard Lydekker